David Stirling Jr. (born January 4, 1981, in Young, Río Negro Department) is an Uruguayan polo player with a 10-goal handicap who currently plays in Argentina for La Dolfina Polo Team. He is ranked number 6, and considered one of the best polo players in the world. He is often referred to as Pelón. He won three consecutive Argentine Triple Crowns from 2013 to 2015.

References

External links
Profile at World Polo Tour
Interview with David Stirling
La Dolfina

Living people
1981 births
Uruguayan people of Scottish descent
Uruguayan polo players
People from Río Negro Department
21st-century Uruguayan sportspeople